Jack Kramer defeated Brown in the final, 6–1, 6–3, 6–2 to win the gentlemen's singles tennis title at the 1947 Wimbledon Championships. Yvon Petra was the defending champion, but lost in the quarterfinals to Tom Brown.

Seeds

  Jack Kramer (champion)
  John Bromwich (fourth round)
  Tom Brown (final)
  Dinny Pails (semifinals)
  Geoff Brown (quarterfinals)
  Jaroslav Drobný (quarterfinals)
  Yvon Petra (quarterfinals)
  Bob Falkenburg (quarterfinals)

Draw

Finals

Top half

Section 1

Section 2

Section 3

Section 4

Bottom half

Section 5

Section 6

Section 7

Section 8

References

External links

Men's Singles
Wimbledon Championship by year – Men's singles